Anastasija Khmelnytska (born 31 December 1997) is a German rhythmic gymnast. She competed in the group rhythmic gymnastics competition at the 2016 Summer Olympics, where the team was eliminated in the qualification round.

References

External links 
 
 

1997 births
Living people
German rhythmic gymnasts
Olympic gymnasts of Germany
Gymnasts at the 2016 Summer Olympics
European Games competitors for Germany
Gymnasts at the 2015 European Games